Daniel Kim may refer to:

 Daniel Dae Kim (born 1968), American actor
 Daniel J. Kim, founder of American frozen yoghurt chain Red Mango
 Daniel K. Kim, founder of Lit Motors